= Mark Bacojo =

Filipino chess player (born 2006)

Mark Jay Bacojo
Personal information
- Born: April 3, 2006 (age 20)

Chess career
- Country: Philippines
- Title: International Master (2025)
- Peak rating: 2396 (July 2026)

Mark Jay Bacojo (born 2006) is a Filipino chess player who holds the title of International Master (IM).

== Chess career ==
He has competed in various international events such as the World Juniors in Petrovac, Montenegro (2025), Singapore International Open (2024), World Youth Open U18 in Montesilvano, Italy (2023), and the Malaysian Open (2023).

Mark Jay achieved his International Master title by finishing Bronze in the 6th ASEAN Individual Chess Championships.

In 2026, he finished tied second in the Russian Chess Crown Standard A held in Moscow, Russia.
